Reuben William Felt (July 7, 1903 – June 12, 1949) was an American politician and farmer.

Felt was born in Fahlun Township Kandiyohi County, Minnesota and went to the University of Minnesota School of Agriculture. He lived with his wife and family, on a farm, in Willmar Township in Kandiyohi County, Minnesota. Felt raised cattle on the farm. Felt served as the Willmar Township clerk. He also served in the Minnesota House of Representatives from 1949 until his death on June 12, 1949.

References

1903 births
1949 deaths
People from Kandiyohi County, Minnesota
University of Minnesota alumni
Farmers from Minnesota
Members of the Minnesota House of Representatives